

Works

Births
 Zahed Gilani (died 1301), a Persian Sufi

Deaths
 Kamo no Chōmei (born 1153), Japanese author, poet (waka), and essayist
 Shota Rustaveli (born 1172), Georgian poet

See also

Poetry
 List of years in poetry

13th-century poetry
Poetry